Trinidad Municipality is located in Beni Department in Bolivia.

Location 
Trinidad Municipio is the southernmost of two municipios in Cercado Province. It borders San Javier Municipality in the North, Moxos Province in the West, and Marbán Province in the South and Southeast.

Trinidad (75,540 inhabitants (2001 census)) is the province capital and is located in the western part of the municipio.

Population 
In the recent two decades, the municipio population has increased from 60,953 inhabitants (1992 census) to 79,963 (2001 census) and an estimated 85,500 inhabitants (2008).

The population density of the municipio is 45.1 inhabitants/km2, the urban population rate is 94.5%. (2001)

Life expectancy at birth is 66.4 years. (2001)

The literacy rate of the population older than 19 years is 94.8%, 97.0% with the male and 92.7% with the female population. (2001)

Cantons and Subcantons 
The municipio covers an area of 1,773 km2 and contains only one canton (Cantón), Trinidad Canton. This is subdivided into ten subcantons (Sub-Cantones):
Trinidad - 76,217 inhabitants (2001)
Loma Suarez - 817 inhabitants
Puerto Balivian - 194 inhabitants
Puerto Barador - 632 inhabitants
Villa Mayor Pedro Vaca Díez - 329 inhabitants
Casarabe - 894 inhabitants
El Cerrito - 190 inhabitants
Ibiato - 404 inhabitants
San Juan de Agua Dulce - 220 inhabitants
San Javier (Monte Azul - Estancia San Nicolas) - 66 inhabitants

References

External links
Detailed map of Province
Economic data of the municipio (Spanish)
Development index of the municipio (Spanish)
Education level of the municipio (Spanish)

Municipalities of Beni Department